The 1985–86 Midland Football Combination season was the 49th in the history of Midland Football Combination, a football competition in England.

Premier Division

The Premier Division featured 19 clubs which competed in the division last season along with one new club, promoted from Division One:
Bloxwich

League table

References

1985–86
8